Célestin Émile Clasquin (Mirecourt, 1875 - 1929) was a French bow maker / archetier.

Son of a violin maker, Clasquin was born in 1875 and served his apprenticeship under Charles Nicolas Bazin.  He joined the Jérôme Thibouville-Lamy firm before establishing his own workshop in Paris in 1918. He also worked for some other violinmakers  and devoted part of his time to repair work.  Clasquin's production consists mainly of violin and cello bows mounted in silver as well as maillechort (French nickel silver).  His production was not abundant, but always of good quality. His style is reminiscent to that  of Émile François Ouchard. He died in Paris in 1929.

Bows made for his own shop were branded: "C. CLASQUIN.PARIS"

References

 
 
 
 Dictionnaire Universel del Luthiers - Rene Vannes 1951,1972, 1985 (vol.3)
 Universal Dictionary of Violin & Bow Makers - William Henley 1970

1875 births
1929 deaths
Bow makers
Luthiers from Mirecourt